Emmanuel Quaye (born 19 June 1965) is a Ghanaian boxer. He competed in the men's light middleweight event at the 1988 Summer Olympics. At the 1988 Summer Olympics, he lost to Segundo Mercado of Ecuador.

References

External links
 

1965 births
Living people
Ghanaian male boxers
Olympic boxers of Ghana
Boxers at the 1988 Summer Olympics
Place of birth missing (living people)
Light-middleweight boxers